Mohamed Mujibur Rahman (born 17 April 1968;) is a Sri Lankan politician and former member of Parliament for the Colombo District. He previously served as a member of the Western Provincial Council for six years before being elected to parliament in 2015. Rahman resigned his seat in parliament on 19 January 2023 to run for the position as Mayor of Colombo.

References  

1968 births
Living people
Sri Lankan Moors
Alumni of Zahira College, Colombo
Samagi Jana Balawegaya politicians
United National Party politicians
Members of the 15th Parliament of Sri Lanka
Members of the 16th Parliament of Sri Lanka